Elwy may refer to:

 the River Elwy, in Wales
 Elwy Yost, Canadian film historian and television host
 Laila Elwi, Egyptian actress sometimes credited as "Laila Elwy"

See also
 Elway (disambiguation)